may refer to:
Hortulus, a book on gardening by the 9th-century monk Walafrid Strabo 
 Hortulus Animae
 4323 Hortulus (1981 QN), a main-belt asteroid that was discovered on 1981 by Paul Wild at Zimmerwald

See also 

 Hortulia
 Corallus hortulanus cooki
 Corallus hortulanus, a non-venomous snake species found in South America
 Halichoeres hortulanus, a species of fish
 Ortolan